Jacco Eltingh and Paul Haarhuis were the defending champions but were eliminated in the round robin.

Donald Johnson and Jared Palmer defeated the defending champions Wayne Ferreira and Yevgeny Kafelnikov in the final, 6–3, 6–2, to win the gentlemen's invitation doubles tennis title at the 2010 Wimbledon Championships.

Draw

Final

Group A
Standings are determined by: 1. number of wins; 2. number of matches; 3. in two-players-ties, head-to-head records; 4. in three-players-ties, percentage of sets won, or of games won; 5. steering-committee decision.

Group B
Standings are determined by: 1. number of wins; 2. number of matches; 3. in two-players-ties, head-to-head records; 4. in three-players-ties, percentage of sets won, or of games won; 5. steering-committee decision.

External links
 Draw

Men's Invitation Doubles